Kalgoorlie Cops is an Australian factual television show that looks at the work of the police in Kalgoorlie, Western Australia. This observational documentary series began on the Crime and Investigation Network in 2011.

Episodes

Season 1 (2011)

See also
Territory Cops
Gold Coast Cops
Beach Cops
The Force: Behind the Line
Border Security: Australia's Front Line
AFP
Highway Patrol (Australian TV series)

References

External links
Official web site https://web.archive.org/web/20120206184059/http://www.citv.com.au/kalgoorlie-cops/

2011 Australian television series debuts
Australian factual television series
English-language television shows
Documentary television series about policing